Mallinckrodt Pharmaceuticals is an American-Irish domiciled manufacturer of specialty pharmaceuticals (namely, adrenocorticotropic hormone), generic drugs and imaging agents. In 2017 it generated 90% of its sales from the U.S. healthcare system.  While Mallinckrodt is headquartered in Ireland for tax purposes, its operational headquarters are in the U.S.  Mallinckrodt's 2013 tax inversion to Ireland drew controversy when it was shown Acthar was Medicaid's most expensive drug.

Mallinckrodt acquires (for repricing), manufactures, and distributes products used in diagnostic procedures and in the treatment of pain and related conditions. This includes the acquisition, manufacture, and distribution of specialty pharmaceuticals, active pharmaceutical ingredients, contrast products, and radiopharmaceuticals. The company employed 5,500 and had net sales of $3.2 billion in 2017; of which $2.9 billion was from the U.S. healthcare system.

The company has been implicated as a major contributor to the prescription opioid scandal around the over-prescription of oxycodone in the United States.

History

Origins 

In 1867, the three Mallinckrodt brothers, Gustav, Otto and Edward Sr., founded G. Mallinckrodt & Co. in St. Louis. The Mallinckrodt family had immigrated from Germany.  Otto and Edward both temporarily returned to Germany, then the leader in chemical research and education, for advanced training.  Brothers Gustav and Otto died in the 1870s, leaving Edward (1845-1928) in sole charge of the family business.  Mallinckrodt Chemical Works was incorporated 15 years later, in 1882.

By 1898, the company had established itself as a pharmaceuticals supplier and in 1913 became the first to introduce barium sulfate as a contrast medium for x-rays. In part due to early success in production of radiology agents, and at the behest of surgeon Evarts Graham, Edward Mallinckrodt Sr. assigned one of the company's top chemists to collaborate in developing the first radiographic agent for gallbladder and bile duct imaging.

Uranium processing (1942–1957) 
In April 1942 Edward Mallinckrodt was approached by a contingent from the Metallurgical Laboratory of the Manhattan Project, particularly by Arthur Holly Compton.  Compton urgently needed a source of refined uranium.  The chemical company already worked with ether, which could theoretically be used in a purifying process but which posed its own handling risks.  With extreme haste and with tight security restrictions, Mallinckrodt developed a novel technique from theoretical concept, to experiment, to full production.  The company submitted test materials by mid-May, supplied the material for the first self-sustaining reaction in December, and had satisfied the project's entire order of the first sixty tons before the contract with the government was even signed.

From 1942 to 1957, Mallinckrodt processed uranium ore into weapons-grade uranium at a factory north of downtown St. Louis. Nuclear waste from the factory and other locations was buried in steel drums at a 21.7-acre site near Lambert Field. Radioactive waste from the site seeped into Coldwater Creek. The area was designated a Superfund site by the Environmental Protection Agency in 1989.

Corporate changes 
The company issued public shares in 1954.  Viewed as an attractive takeover target in the era of leveraged buyouts, Mallinckrodt was bought by Avon Products in 1982 and largely kept intact as a business entity.  Just four years later it was sold to International Minerals and Chemical Corporation.  After re-brandings, spin-offs and other changes of corporate identity Mallinckrodt was again sold in 2000 to Tyco International.

Ties to Washington University in St. Louis 
Throughout its history, Washington University in St. Louis has received a large number of donations from the Mallinckrodt family and corporation, including a posthumous endowment by Edward Mallinckrodt Jr. on behalf of his father to the Washington University School of Medicine Radiology Department resulting in the creation of the Mallinckrodt Institute of Radiology. Both Edward Mallinckrodt Sr. and Jr. served as members of the Washington University Board of Trustees. Washington University in St. Louis’ student union building and performing arts building was renamed the Mallinckrodt Center in 1976.

In 2018, Mallinckrodt partnered with the Washington University School of Medicine with funding of up to $10 million over five years to support research projects that show promise in developing new drugs for treating rare diseases.

The elder Edward also made significant donations to his alma mater, Harvard University, and to the St. Louis College of Pharmacy.

Tax inversion to Ireland (2013)

In 2013, Mallinckrodt executed a corporate tax inversion to Ireland to avoid U.S. corporate taxes, by acquiring Irish-based Cadence Pharma for $1.3 billion. This was despite the fact that almost all of Mallinckrodt's revenues come from the U.S. market (see table below). In 2015, Mallinckrodt was one of several U.S. tax inversions that The Wall Street Journal reported to be using a lower tax-platform to acquire further U.S. pharmaceutical firms, such as the $5.6 billion acquisition of Questor in 2014.  In December 2015, The Irish Times reported the CEO as saying that "It’d have to be a pretty dramatic change to the US tax code" for Mallinckrodt to return to the U.S., and that "We’re already foreign domiciled, so we may as well take full advantage of it".

In February 2018, Mallinckrodt told the Wall Street Journal that it would get a $450 to $500 million tax credits from the Tax Cuts and Jobs Act of 2017 (TCJA), but that some of these benefits would be offset by the anti-inversion provisions of the TCJA.  In April 2018, Mallinckrodt's Irish tax inversion came under further scrutiny when it was revealed that Mallinckrodt's main drug, Acthar, was one of the most expensive drug-related expenditures for the U.S. Medicare programme.

Acthar controversy

In December 2012, The New York Times, in an article on Mallinckrodt's main drug H.P. Acthar Gel, reported: "How the price of this drug rose so far, so fast is a story for these troubled times in American health care — a tale of aggressive marketing, questionable medicine and, not least, out-of-control costs". In January 2017, the Financial Times reported that Mallinckrodt had made a settlement of $100 million with the U.S. Federal Trade Commission (FTC) in relation to antitrust probes on Acthar and quoted the FTC as saying: "Questcor [Mallinckrodt's subsidiary] took advantage of its monopoly to repeatedly raise the price of Acthar, from $40 per vial in 2001 to more than $34,000 per vial today – an 85,000 percent increase". The city of Rockford, Illinois, is now suing Mallinckrodt and pharmacy benefit management company Express Scripts for their failure to reduce Acthar's price.

In May 2017, the Wall Street Journal reported that U.S. investor Jim Chanos accused Mallinckrodt in relation to Acthar of being a "one-product company", and the Irish Times quoted Chanos on Bloomberg stating that a "murky alliance" had developed between Mallinckrodt and distributor Express Scripts, who is the sole distributor of Acthar, and that "Acthar is the epitome of excessive drug prices".  In September 2017, the Journal of the American Medical Association (JAMA) published research showing that Acthar was one of the most expensive drugs in the U.S. Medicaid and Medicare system, but that most sales of Acthar were "driven in part by a relatively small group of doctors who were prescribing it heavily", and that alternatives at one-fiftieth of the price of Acthar were available.

In April 2018, a whistleblower lawsuit claimed Acthar, which had never passed a modern FDA process as Acthar had been available for 60 years and was thus passed under FDA "grandfathering" rules, had an unknown formulation and efficacy. The lawsuit claimed that this situation would not be sustainable without the support of Express Scripts.

Role in opioid crisis

A US Drug Enforcement Administration (DEA) database was made public in 2019 that tracks every opioid pill sold in the United States from 2006 through 2012. The database shows that the "vast majority of the 76 billion opioid pills produced and shipped from 2006 through 2012 to three companies", one of which was SpecGx, a subsidiary of Mallinckrodt. In those years SpecGx supplied 28.9 billion oxycodone pills, more than 80 for each person in the United States, and over 2 billion pills just in Florida.

In 2011 the DEA complained to Mallinckrodt about the problem of excessive prescription opioid shipments to pharmacies. DEA officials showed the company the hundreds of millions of doses of oxycodone it was shipping to distributors and the correspondingly high number of arrests being made for oxycodone possession and sale in those areas. Negotiations between the DEA and Mallinckrodt ensued, and in 2017 Mallinckrodt paid a $35 million fine to settle DEA complaints it did not adequately address suspicious opioid orders, acknowledging “certain aspects of Mallinckrodt’s system to monitor and detect suspicious orders did not meet" DEA standards.

Mallinckrodt announced in April 2019 a plan to change its name to Sonorant Therapeutics, and spin off ‘Mallinckrodt Inc.’ as a separate company for its generics business. Legal liabilities that result from opioid litigation would “remain with Mallinckrodt Inc. or its subsidiaries following the separation.”

In February 2020, the company struck a $1.6 billion deal with Florida and dozens of other states to settle lawsuits over its role in the US opioid crisis.

In October 2020, Mallinckrodt, filed for Chapter 11 bankruptcy protection while facing more than $1 billion in costs from lawsuits over its role in fueling the opioid crisis.

Major acquisitions
 1981 – Mallinckrodt was listed among Fortune 500 companies
 1982 – Avon Products, Inc. acquired Mallinckrodt
 1986 – International Minerals and Chemical Corporation (IMCERA Group Inc.) acquired Mallinckrodt from Avon Products
 1988 – Malinckrodt was mentioned in The New York Times as the only company to receive an exception from the DEA for cocaine possession and processing
 1992 – Malinckrodt owned HemoCue
 1995 – Mallinckrodt established generic pharmaceuticals business
 1996 – Mallinckrodt acquired maker of urology imaging systems and injectors, Liebel-Flarsheim Co.
 2000 – Tyco International acquired Mallinckrodt 
 2007 – Tyco Healthcare spun off as Covidien, an independent company. The healthcare business units were spun off under the name Covidien.
 2011 – Covidien announced plans to spin off Mallinckrodt Pharmaceuticals, and Mallinckrodt Plc was separated on June 28, 2013, trading on the ticker MNK from July 1, 2013.
 2012 – Mallinckrodt announced acquisition of CNS Therapeutics for $100 million
 2013 – Mallinckrodt spun off from Covidien and began trading under ticker symbol MNK
 2013 – Mallinckrodt acquired Cadence Pharmaceuticals for £1.3 billion in an Irish corporate tax inversion to escape U.S. taxes.
 2014 – Mallinckrodt acquired Questcor Pharmaceuticals for $5.6 billion (owner of Acthar); Mallinckrodt joins the S&P 500
 2015 – Mallinckrodt acquired Ikaria Inc. for $2.3 billion
 2015 – Mallinckrodt acquired Therakos for $1.325 billion
 2015 – Mallinckrodt sold the Contrast Media and Deliver Systems portion of its portfolio to Guerbet for $270M cash with a loan financed by BNP Paribas
 2016 – Mallinckrodt acquired regenerative medicine company Stratatech
 2017 – In September, Mallinckrodt acquired specialty pharmaceutical company, InfaCare Pharmaceutical Corporation. In November the company announced its intention to acquire Ocera Therapeutics for up to $117 million.
 2018 - In February 2018, Mallinckrodt acquired Sucampo Pharmaceuticals.

In December 2018 the company announced it will spin off its specialty generics business into a separate publicly traded company, initially owned by existing Mallinckrodt shareholders. The division generated $840 million in 2017 and the deal will also include constipation drug, Amitiza. Chief Financial Officer, Matthew Harbaugh, will head the new company which will retain the Mallinckrodt name. The remaining business of specialty branded products will be renamed and led by current Chief Executive Officer, Mark Trudeau. Legal liabilities that result from opioid litigation are expected to be the responsibility of Mallinckrodt Inc. or its subsidiaries following the separation.

Products
Mallinckrodt has two main product lines.
 Specialty Pharmaceuticals products include branded drugs as well as specialty generics and active pharmaceutical ingredients (APIs).  Products include biologics, medicinal opioids, synthetic controlled substances, and acetaminophen.
 Medical Imaging products include contrast media and radiopharmaceuticals for medical imaging applications.

In the fourth quarter of 2014, Specialty Pharmaceuticals accounted for 74% of net sales. Key specialty pharmaceutical products include:
 Acthar gel, an injectable biopharmaceutical used for the treatment of infantile spasms, acute exacerbations of multiple sclerosis, and certain orphan diseases.  Mallinckrodt acquired this product via its acquisition of Questcor Pharmaceuticals in 2014.  When Questcor acquired the drug in 2001 it sold for $40 a vial; within a year of the acquisition Questcor raised the price of the drug to $1,500 per vial and to $28,000 by 2013.  In 2013, Questcor acquired the US rights to a competing product, Synacthen Depot, from Novartis.  In 2014 Mallinckrodt raised the price of Acthar further to $34,000.  The Federal Trade Commission and attorneys general from five states sued Mallinckrodt for anti-competitive behavior with regard to the acquisition of Synacthen Depot and the monopolistic pricing of Acthar, and in January 2017 the company settled, agreeing to pay $100 million and to license Synacthen Depot to a competitor.
 Ofirmev is a proprietary IV formulation of acetaminophen used in conjunction with opioid painkillers in the post surgical setting.
 Xartemis XR is a controlled release oral combination of acetaminophen and oxycodone for the treatment of acute pain.
 Exalgo is a once-daily, long-acting form of hydromorphone, another pain drug.

Key generic specialty products include:
 Hydrocodone API and tablets
 Oxycodone API and tablets
 Methylphenidate hydrochloride extended release tablets
 Dextroamphetamine sulfate controlled release tablets
 Other controlled substances, including methadone, and acetaminophen-containing products

Medical Imaging products include Optiray (ioversol injection), an iodide based contrast medium for CT scans, and Optimark (gadoversetamide injection) a Gadolinium-Based Contrast Agent used in magnetic resonance imaging of the brain or liver.

As of 1988, Mallinckrodt was the only company in the U.S. that is allowed to receive cocaine, which is sold as a prescription drug for use in hospitals as a local anesthetic by eye and ear, nose and throat doctors.

See also
 Corporate tax inversions
 Ireland as a tax haven

Notes

References

External links
 

Pharmaceutical companies established in 1867
Companies formerly listed on the New York Stock Exchange
Tax inversions
Pharmaceutical companies of Ireland
1867 establishments in Missouri
Companies that filed for Chapter 11 bankruptcy in 2020
Companies traded over-the-counter in the United States